Thy Serpent is a Finnish black metal band from Espoo. It started out as a solo project by Sami Tenetz in 1992. A full lineup was acquired in 1995.

History 
After two demos, he signed a record deal with Spinefarm Records. Azhemin, Agathon and Luopio joined between 1995 and 1996 when they released their debut, Forests of Witchery.  "Only Dust Moves" was featured on the Nightwish single "The Carpenter". After their debut album's success, their international debut, Christcrusher, followed.

Contrary to their statements that they would never play live, they did eight gigs in Finland in the summer of 1999. In 2000, Thy Serpent changed its line-up, adding a second guitarist and a new drummer. During that year, they went to the studio to record Death, which remains the last record by the band. They are now signed to Candlelight Records.

Band members 
 Azhemin - Vocals / Bass / Synth
 Sami Tenetz - Guitar
 Teemu Laitinen - Drums 
 Tomi Ullgren - Lead Guitar

Former members 
 Pekka - Drums (1995)
 Börje - Guitar (1995)
 Teemu Raimoranta - Guitar (1995-1996; died 2003)
 Alexi Laiho - Guitar (1997; died 2020)
 Agathon - Drums/ Vocals (1996-1999; died 2022)
 Luopio - Bass/ Vocals (1996-1998)

Discography 
 Frozen Memory Demo (1994)
 Into Everlasting Fire Demo (1995)
 Forests of Witchery (1996)
 Lords of Twilight (MCD) (1997)
 Christcrusher (1998)
 Death (2000)
 Wolfnacht / Goatmoon / Thy Serpent (split, 2022)

References
[ Thy Serpent] at AllMusic

External links
 
 
 Thy Serpent at Encyclopaedia Metallum

Finnish black metal musical groups
Espoo
Symphonic black metal musical groups
Finnish symphonic metal musical groups
Musical quartets
Musical groups established in 1994